Archibald Brewster Grant (24 July 1904 – 6 June 1970) was a New Zealand railway worker and trade unionist. He was born in Millerton, West Coast, New Zealand on 24 July 1904.

References

1904 births
1970 deaths
New Zealand trade unionists
People from the West Coast, New Zealand
New Zealand railway workers